a.k.a. Pablo is an American sitcom television series starring Paul Rodriguez that aired on ABC from March 6 to April 10, 1984. It was executive produced by Norman Lear.

Synopsis
The series focuses on struggling Hispanic stand-up comic Paul Rivera and his large Mexican American family, who still called him by his given name Pablo. While they supported his career and longed for his success, his traditionalist parents were offended by the ethnic humor he incorporated into his act and urged him to be more respectful of his heritage. Rounding out the boisterous family were his sister Lucia and know-it-all brother-in-law Hector and their five children, his "stuffed shirt" brother Manuel and flirty sister-in-law Carmen and their two children, and his very-anxious-to-wed spinster sister Sylvia. José was Paul/Pablo's slick but inexperienced agent.

The cast included Paul Rodriguez, Joe Santos, Katy Jurado, Héctor Elizondo and Mario Lopez.

The first episode of the ABC series aired on Tuesday, March 6, 1984, at 8:30 p.m. Eastern and Pacific times. The show was cancelled after six broadcasts.

In 2002 TV Guide ranked the series number 45 on its "50 Worst TV Shows of All Time" list.

Cast
 Paul Rodriguez as "Paul" Pablo Rivera
 Joe Santos as Domingo Rivera
 Katy Jurado as Rosa Maria Rivera
 Alma Cuervo as Sylvia Rivera
 Martha Velez as Lucia Rivera Del Gato
 Arnaldo Santana as Hector Del Gato
 Bert Rosario as Manuel Rivera
 Maria Richwine as Carmen Rivera
 Hector Elizondo as José Sanchez/Shapiro
 Edie Marie Rubio as Linda Rivera
 Antonio Torres as Nicholas Rivera
 Fezwick DaPoochie as Pancho 
 Claudia Gonzales as Anna Maria Del Gato
 Martha Gonzales as Susana Del Gato
 Mario Lopez as Tomas Del Gato
 Beto Lovato as Mario Del Gato
 Michelle Smith as Elena Del Gato

US television ratings

Episodes

References

External links
 

1984 American television series debuts
1984 American television series endings
1980s American sitcoms
American Broadcasting Company original programming
English-language television shows
Television series about families
Television series by Sony Pictures Television
Television series created by Norman Lear
Television shows set in Los Angeles
Latino sitcoms